Einar Hareide (born 27 March 1959 in Hareid) is a Norwegian industrial designer.

References

Norwegian industrial designers
1959 births
Living people
People from Hareid